Pyramid railway station is located on the Piangil line in Victoria, Australia. It serves the town of Pyramid Hill, and it opened on 12 February 1884 as Pyramid Hill. It was renamed Pyramid on 9 May 1904.

History

Pyramid opened on 12 February 1884. On 25 October 1884, the line was extended to Kerang. The station, like the township itself, was named after the Surveyor General of New South Wales, Thomas Mitchell, set up base with his party near the rise of a hill he named Pyramid Hill on 29 June 1836. Mitchell noted that the hill resembled the pyramids of Egypt.

A disused goods shed and silos are located opposite the station.

The former No. 2 track was abolished in June 1988, along with the Up and Down end plunger locked points leading to it. The Up and Down points were realigned to connect to No. 3 track.

Pyramid closed as a crossing station on 31 December 1993.

Disused station Mitiamo is located between Pyramid and Dingee, whilst disused station Macorna is located between Pyramid and Kerang.

Pyramid station is one of the least used railway stations in Victoria and the least used station on the Swan Hill line, with only 2,670 passengers in the 2016-2017 financial year. This equates to around 7.31 passengers per day.

Platforms and services

Pyramid has one platform. It is serviced by V/Line Swan Hill line services.

Platform 1:
 services to Southern Cross and Swan Hill

There are infrequent services operating on the Swan Hill line including those stopping at Pyramid. Currently, there are only two trains in each direction stopping each day.

Transport links

V/Line operates a road coach service from Bendigo to Swan Hill and Mildura via Pyramid station.

References

External links

Victorian Railway Stations gallery
Melway map at street-directory.com.au

Regional railway stations in Victoria (Australia)